"A Little Gasoline" is a song written by Dean Miller and Tammy Rogers, and recorded by Canadian country music artist Terri Clark.  It was released in July 2000 as the first single from her album Fearless.  The song reached number 9 on the RPM Country Tracks chart in September 2000 and number 13 on the Billboard Hot Country Singles & Tracks chart.

Critical reception
Deborah Evans Price, of Billboard magazine reviewed the song favorably, calling the song a "midtempo outing, a meaty production propelled by plenty o' steel fiddles and the aforementioned banjo." She goes on to say that the "see-ya lyric works well enough, as tired as the road/car imagery may be-seems like nobody ever exits a relationship on a bicycle."

Music video
The music video was directed by Thom Oliphant and premiered in mid-2000. Most of the video was filmed on a section of Alberta Highway 2 near Red Deer, Alberta known as Gasoline Alley.

Chart performance
"A Little Gasoline" debuted at number 67 on the U.S. Billboard Hot Country Singles & Tracks for the week of July 22, 2000.

References

2000 singles
2000 songs
Terri Clark songs
Song recordings produced by Keith Stegall
Mercury Records singles
Songs written by Dean Miller